Birnie is a surname. Notable people with the surname include:

Alexander Birnie, (1763–1835), Scottish merchant and shipowner
David and Catherine Birnie, Australian husband and wife pair of serial killers
Esmond Birnie (born 1965), author, economist, and Ulster Unionist Party politician
George Birnie Esslemont (1860–1917), British Liberal politician
Harry Charles Birnie (1882–1943), Scottish seaman, captain with the Cunard line and commodore in the Royal Navy Reserve
James Birnie (1799–1864), Scottish fur trader in the Pacific Northwest
John Birnie Philip (1824–1875), English sculptor of the 19th century
Patricia Birnie (1926–2013), British lawyer
Ted Birnie (1878–1935), professional footballer and manager
Tessa Birnie (1934–2008), New Zealand-born Australian concert pianist
William Birnie Rhind (1853–1933), Scottish sculptor